The Oltenian Sahara is a name given to an area in the Romanian region of Oltenia covering the territory between the city of Calafat and the town of Dăbuleni, spanning an area of about , or 6% of Dolj County.

The sandy areas in the region have extended because of deforestation events that occurred in the 1960s, during the Communist period. Under the leadership of Nicolae Ceaușescu, 26% of Romania's water was drained for farmland, including all five of Oltenia's natural water bodies. One such body of water was the -long Potelu Lake (near Potelu village), now completely dry. Another village on the lake's shore was  Grojdibodu; locals recall how people survived by fishing, and the air was humid and clean, before the communist authorities built dams and a pumping station to dry out the lake. According to Dan Popescu, the head of the local "Rebirth of the Forest" association,  of forest were cut down and replaced with acacia trees to stop the wind and the sand.

After the Romanian Revolution of 1989 things deteriorated further. The land was returned to private hands, but the landowners cleared out  of forest, including the acacia canopies, and grew whatever they wanted, overwhelming the irrigation system. In the early 2000s, some farmers sought to irrigate the fields by themselves, but, without state support, those attempts failed, and the  system was eventually torn down by scrap iron thieves.

Due to the sudden desertification in the area, the name "Oltenian Sahara" quickly caught on among the locals. Dăbuleni has likewise gained the nickname the "capital" of the Oltenian Sahara and it is the only place in Europe where a sand museum exists.

References

Oltenia
Deserts of Europe
Environmental issues in Romania
Desertification